Mars Pa More, formerly Mars is a Philippine television talk show broadcast by GMA News TV and GMA Network. Originally hosted by Camille Prats and Suzi Entrata-Abrera, it premiered on GMA News TV on June 11, 2012 on the network's evening line up as Mars. The show aired its final episode on GMA News TV on May 31, 2019. It moved to GMA Network on July 8, 2019 on the network's morning line up as Mars Pa More replacing Ugly Duckling. The show concluded on July 1, 2022. Prats, Iya Villania and Kim Atienza serve as the final hosts.

Premise

The shows introduces a roster of kids who have abilities to sing, dance and cook. The show also features discussions and activities such as home-cooked recipes, family-friendly games, crafts, musical segments, social media trend challenges, travel suggestions, tips for beauty and home living for mothers.

Hosts
 Camille Prats 
 Iya Villania 
 Kim Atienza 

Former host
 Suzi Entrata-Abrera 

Guest host
 Chariz Solomon

Production
In March 2020, the admission of a live audience in the studio and production were suspended due to the enhanced community quarantine in Luzon by the COVID-19 pandemic. The show resumed its programming on July 27, 2020.

Accolades

References

External links
 
 

2012 Philippine television series debuts
2022 Philippine television series endings
Filipino-language television shows
GMA Network original programming
GMA News TV original programming
Philippine television talk shows
Television productions suspended due to the COVID-19 pandemic